Stephen Brinkley (c. 1550 – missing since 1585) was an English printer, covertly producing Roman Catholic literature under Elizabeth I of England. He was imprisoned and tortured as manager of a secret press for the publication of devotional and controversial works.

Life
He was a member of an association of Roman Catholic unmarried gentlemen of property, organised by Father George Gilbert, SJ, and solemnly blessed by Pope Gregory XIII in 1580. The association's purpose was to raise funds for the support of priests, to convert Protestants, and, at a time when priests traveled in disguise, without papers of identification, to arrange for introductions which would guard both priests and laity against betrayal. The members undertook to content themselves with the bare necessaries of their state of life, to spend the remainder of their goods in the cause of the Church, and to devote themselves wholly to the salvation of souls and the conversion of heretics. 

At this time Father Robert Persons, SJ and Edmund Campion were preparing for a vigorous propaganda through the press. With the assistance of several of the old Marian priests, Persons procured from the elder Brooks, owner of a large house called Greenstreet, at East Ham, Essex, then five miles from London, permission for certain gentleman to lodge there. To this house, chiefly with the assistance of Brinkley, Persons conveyed a printing press and materials. Brinkley's seven workman appeared in public with fine clothes and horses, to avert suspicion. The parson and churchwardens urged the newly arrived gentlemen to attend services; an incautious purchase of paper almost gave a clue to the discovery of the press, and a servant of Brinkley's was caught and racked. 

Their first book, however, probably a work of devotion or of encouragement to Catholics, was successfully issued. Brinkley moved the press to the home of Francis Browne, brother of Anthony Browne, 1st Viscount Montagu. Persons issued A brief Censure upon two Books written in answer to M. Edmund Campion's Offer of Disputation in 1581. Campion's challenge was then circulating in manuscript. Caution was required in the management of Brinkley's Press. Government experts, like Norton, reported that the Brinkley books, in spite of the Douai imprint, had been produced in England; the landlord Brooks was suspicious; information as to the press was inquired of Father Briant upon the rack. After a second removal, Brinkley printed, at a lodge belonging to Dame Cecilia Stonor's house, near Henley-on-Thames, Campion's "Decem Rationes". At Oxford, on Commemoration Day, 27 June 1581, the benches of St. Mary's Church were found strewn with copies of this ringing challenge to the universities.

The capture of Campion near Oxford Sunday evening, 16 July, was followed in a few weeks by that of Brinkley and his printers. Brinkley, though tortured in the Tower of London, escaped the fate of his fellow prisoner, William Carter, a Catholic printer, who was executed at Tyburn. Brinkley was discharged in June 1583. He accompanied Father Persons first to Rome, where we find his name in the Pilgrim Book of the English College in the following September, and thence in the following year to Rouen. Here, with George Flinton, Brinkley printed a second edition of a work which Flinton had brought out in 1581, The Christian Directory.

After Flinton's death about 1585, Brinkley continued to issue Catholic books. The date of his death is unknown. Joseph Gillow mentions a work translated from the Italian (Paris, 1579), entitled The Exercise of a Christian Life ... newly perused and corrected by the translatour (James Sancer). Sancer, or Sanker, is known to have been the pseudonym of Brinkley. This work, perhaps, is one of the early issues of Brinkley's own press.

References

Attribution
 The entry cites:
Joseph Gillow, Bibl. Dict. of English Catholics;
John Morris, Troubles of Our Catholic Forefathers, second series;
Simpson, Life of Edmund Campion (London, 1867);
Law Historical Sketch of the Jesuits and Seculars in the Reign of Elizabeth (London, 1900).

1550 births
English Roman Catholics
English printers
Year of death unknown
16th-century English businesspeople
16th-century Roman Catholics